Razib Khan (রাজীব খান Razyb Khan) is a Bangladeshi-American writer in population genetics and consumer genomics.

Life and education
Khan was born in Dhaka, Bangladesh but moved to the United States at the age of five. His family is Bengali Muslim from the Comilla District of eastern Bangladesh. In kindergarten his teacher pronounced his name "Razib" and the name stuck. He grew up in Upstate New York and Eastern Oregon. Though brought up a Muslim, he was an atheist from an early age. 

At the University of Oregon, he completed his Bachelor of Science in biochemistry in 2000, and completed his Bachelor of Science in biology in 2006. Razib also did graduate work at the University of California at Davis. During the early 2000s Khan initially worked as a software engineer, but received funding from Ron Unz and switched his focus to science.

Research and publications
In 2002, Khan co-founded a blog called Gene Expression which discussed technical and social issues in genetics.  Since writing for Gene Expression, he has written science articles for numerous mainstream publications, and many of the articles touched on controversial subjects such as race, gender, and intelligence. Khan's publications have been cited by popular science writers, including his work on the migrations of Southeast Asian Civilizations, Jewish migrations family genetics, and consumer genetics.

In 2014, Khan made news when he sequenced his son's genome in utero. Antonio Regalado wrote his son may be the first healthy person to have his entire genome sequenced before being born.  In an interview with Don Gonyea, Khan stated his child was the most important thing in his life, so it made sense to know everything about his genetics.  He was able to obtain the genome sequence by requesting a chorionic villus sampling (CVS) test.  After obtaining the raw genetic data, Khan used the free software Promethease to analyze the data.  Khan believes society is in the "second age of eugenics," and full genome sequences of fetuses will become standard procedure for parents in the 21st century.  Ainsley Newson wrote "Khan's decision to obtain the whole genome sequence of his partner's fetus while in utero shows us that genomics is no longer a fantasy."

In March 2015, the New York Times announced that it had hired Khan on a short-term contract, and that he would write about once a month for the Times.  The Times wrote he is "a science blogger and a doctoral candidate in genomics and genetics at the University of California, Davis. He writes about evolution, genetics, religion, politics and philosophy."  The same day the Times announced hiring Khan, Gawker published an opinion piece written by J.K Trotter, who noted that Khan also wrote blogs for Taki's Magazine, a site "founded in 2007 by Taki Theodoracopulos, the flamboyantly racist Greek." As a result of Khan's history of writing for controversial publications, the Times removed him as a regular periodic contributor, but stated they remain "open to consideration of submissions from him" in the op-Ed pages. The Times did not specifically mention the part of Khan's work they found uncomfortable,  
and he wrote two op-eds for the Times before they ended his contract. Khan wrote on Twitter, "yeah, told me today. may contribute one-off op-eds in future. i’m chill about it. it wasn’t a surprise that ppl went ballistic."
In a 2016 interview with the economist and podcaster James Miller, referring to the cancelled Times contract, Khan stated, "I have a clean conscience because I say what I think is true." 

Khan has written articles for publications associated with the alt-right and far-right, including The Unz Review and Taki's Magazine. In 2015, writer Michael Schulson described his career as an example of the "murky line between mainstream science and scientific racism."

Books
He contributed a chapter titled Genetic Origin of Indo-Aryans in the 2019 book Which Of Us Are Aryans?. The book was co-authored by Romila Thapar, Michael Witzel, Jaya Menon and Kai Friese.

Other projects 
In December 2010, Khan co-founded the group blog Brown Pundits together with British-Pakistani Bahá'í Zachary L. Zavidé and Pakistani-American Omar Ali. The blog pertains mainly to South Asian issues. In October 2018 they began an associated podcast called The Brown Pundits Podcast.

References

External links

Year of birth missing (living people)
Living people
21st-century atheists
American atheists
American former Muslims
American science writers
American people of Bengali descent
American people of Bangladeshi descent
American writers of Bangladeshi descent
Bangladeshi biologists
People from Dhaka
University of Oregon alumni